Plutonium(III) bromide is an inorganic salt of bromine and plutonium with the formula PuBr3. This radioactive green solid has few uses, however its crystal structure is often used as a structural archetype in crystallography.

Crystal structure

The PuBr3 crystal structure was first published in 1948 by William Houlder Zachariasen. The compound forms orthorhombic crystals, a type of square antiprism, within which the Pu atoms adopt an 8-coordinate bicapped trigonal prismatic arrangement. Its Pearson symbol is oS16 with the corresponding space group No. 63 (in International Union of Crystallography classification) or Cmcm (in Hermann–Mauguin notation). The majority of trivalent chloride and bromide salts of lanthanide and actinides crystallise in the PuBr3 structure.

References

Plutonium(III) compounds
Actinide halides
Crystal structure types